Tomáš Krupa (born 14 November 1972) is a former professional tennis player and now coach from the Czech Republic.

Biography
Krupa was a doubles specialist, most successful during his partnership with countryman Pavel Vízner. The pair made the semi-finals of the 1993 Romanian Open and were finalists at the Prague Open in 1994. They were unable to compete in the Prague final, giving opponents Karel Nováček and Mats Wilander the title in a walkover. In 1999 he made another ATP Tour semi-final, at the International Raiffeisen Grand Prix tournament in Sankt Pölten, with Petr Pála, in a run which included a win over second seeds David Adams and John-Laffnie de Jager. He won a total of four titles on the Challenger circuit.

As a coach he is most famous for his involvement with Tomáš Berdych, who he coached from 2009 to 2014, during which time he made the final of Wimbledon. Prior to this he worked with Radek Štěpánek. More recently he has been the coach of Jiří Veselý and Barbora Strýcová.

ATP Tour career finals

Doubles: 1 (0–1)

Challenger titles

Doubles: (4)

References

External links
 
 

1972 births
Living people
Czech male tennis players
Czech tennis coaches